Taghreed Hikmat (born 1945) is a Jordanian judge. She was Jordan's first female judge when she started in 1998. She was also a judge on the International Criminal Tribunal for Rwanda from 2003 to 2011. Later she served in the Senate of Jordan. Since October 2020 she has been a judge on the Constitutional Court of Jordan.

Career
Hikmat was born in Zarqa in 1945. She studied law at Damascus University between 1969 and 1973. In 1982 Hikmat started working as a lawyer representing clients before the courts. In 1996 she became assistant to the Attorney General of the Civil Rights Division. In 1998 Hikmat was appointed as a judge at the Court of Appeal. This made her the first woman judge in Jordan. Between 2002 and 2003 she was a judge on the Higher Criminal Court.

In June 2003 Hikmat was one of 18 judges elected by the United Nations General Assembly to serve ad litem at the International Criminal Tribunal for Rwanda (ICTR). In September the next year Kofi Annan, the Secretary-General of the United Nations, appointed her as a temporary judge on the tribunal. Hikmat was a judge at the ICTR until 2011, and was a presiding judge from 2009 to 2010.

Hikmat was a member of the Senate of Jordan during the 26th and the 27th sessions. On 6 October 2020 she was appointed a judge on the Constitutional Court of Jordan. She was sworn in by King Abdullah II of Jordan on 19 October 2020.

Hikmat has criticized Jordanian political parties for having superficial political programmes that only aim at women for their votes. Hikmat has noted several challenges to political participation of women in Jordan, including a patriarchal system, stereotypical views on gender roles and a lack of economic independence from men.

References

1945 births
Living people
21st-century Jordanian women politicians
21st-century Jordanian politicians
Damascus University alumni
International Criminal Tribunal for Rwanda judges
Jordanian judges
Jordanian judges of United Nations courts and tribunals
Jordanian women lawyers
Members of the Senate of Jordan
People from Zarqa